José Guadalupe Osuna Millán (born December 10, 1955) is a Mexican economist and politician member of the National Action Party (PAN) who served as Governor of Baja California.

Personal life and education
Osuna graduated in Economics from the Universidad Autónoma de Baja California and has a Master's Degree in Economics from the Instituto Politécnico Nacional.

Political career
Osuna worked in the private sector before becoming an active PAN member. He has served as municipal president of Tijuana (1995—1998) and as the Director of the State Commission of Water.

In 2003, he was elected as Federal Representative in the  LIX Legislature of the Mexican Congress for the V Electoral District of Baja California.

In 2007 he ran as the PAN candidate for Governor of Baja California in the 2007 Baja California state election. Osuna won the election defeating the PRI candidate Jorge Hank. Currently he is leading an effort to crack down on the drug cartels and corruption within the state government.

Government career
 1979-1981. Secretariat of Programs and Budget. Researcher.
 1982-1984. Baja California Autonomous University. School of Economics. Deputy Director of Academics.
 1984. Baja California Autonomous University. Economic and Social Studies Institute. Director.
 1983-1985. Secretariat of Human Settlement and Public Works of the State of Baja California (SAHOPE). Director of Public Investment.
 1985-1986. Secretariat of Human Settlements and Public Works of the State of Baja California (SAHOPE). Director of the Ensenada-Guadalupe Valley Aqueduct.
 1989. Secretariat of Human Settlements and Public Works of the State of Baja California (SAHOPE). Under Secretary of Public Investment.
 1990-1995. Tijuana's State Commission of Public Services (CESPT). Director.
 1995-1998. Mayor of Tijuana, Municipality of Tijuana.
 1998-2000. Baja California State Water Commissión.  Director.
 2003-2006. Federal Representative at the Chamber of Deputies.
 2007-2013. Governor of state of Baja California.

See also
 2007 Baja California state election
 1995 Baja California state election
 2003 Mexican legislative election

References

External links
Campaign site
José Guadalupe Osuna Millán resume as Federal Representative

National Action Party (Mexico) politicians
Municipal presidents of Tijuana
Governors of Baja California
Instituto Politécnico Nacional alumni
Politicians from Tijuana
1956 births
Living people
Politicians from Sinaloa
Autonomous University of Baja California alumni
20th-century Mexican politicians
21st-century Mexican politicians